The Wings Museum is an aviation museum located in Sussex, United Kingdom.  It is housed in a  hangar-like former farm building in Brantridge Lane, between Handcross and Balcombe.  The museum displays mainly World War II-related flying memorabilia and equipment which have been donated, or which have been recovered and restored by volunteers.

History
The museum was originally located at Redhill Aerodrome.  By 2011 it had relocated to Brantridge Lane.

In 2013, the museum hosted a fundraiser for the upkeep of the Bomber Command Memorial in nearby Green Park.

In 2015, volunteers restored a Bristol Beaufighter Mk1f which had crashed 75 years earlier.

Aircraft collection
Visitors to the museum can walk inside a complete fuselage from a Douglas C-47 Dakota which was used on D-Day and later during the filming of the television series Band of Brothers.

There are some very rare aircraft from World War II and some of them are the only ones of their type in the UK.

Turbine engine aircraft
 Hawker Siddeley Kestrel XS694 (under restoration and parts in storage)

Piston engine aircraft
North American B-25J-25-NC 44-30861 (under restoration)
Bell P-63 King cobra - 43-11137 (under restoration); the museum has five more in storage
Douglas A-20 Boston (displayed as found)
Nakajima B5N2 Kate (very large fuselage and wing section)
Douglas C-47 Dakota (fuselage from Band of Brothers)
Hawker Hurricane (wreck)

Aircraft cockpits
Douglas A-26 Invader 43-22649
Bristol Beaufighter 1f
Curtis Helldiver SB2C-5 (in storage)
Jet Provost XM486 (in storage)
English Electric Canberra (in storage)
De Havilland Chipmunk WD377
North American B-25 Mitchell

Simulators
Link trainer

Piston engines
Rolls-Royce Merlin ×5 (one running as a living memorial)
Junkers Jumo 211
Daimler Benz 610

See also
List of aerospace museums

References

External links

Official website of the Wings Museum

Military aviation museums in England
Museums in West Sussex